Liu Zhonghua (born March 1965) is a Chinese agronomist and professor and doctoral supervisor at Hunan Agricultural University.

Biography
Liu was born in Hengyang, Hunan, in March 1965. He earned his bachelor's degree and master's degree at Hunan Agricultural University under the direction of Shi Zhaopeng. In July 2014 he received his doctor's degree from Tsinghua University.

After graduating from Hunan Agricultural University, he taught there, where he was promoted to associate professor in 1992 and to full professor in 1999.

Honours and awards
 November 22, 2019 Member of the Chinese Academy of Engineering (CAE)

References

1965 births
Living people
People from Hengyang
Engineers from Hunan
Hunan Agricultural University alumni
Academic staff of Hunan Agricultural University
Tsinghua University alumni
Members of the Chinese Academy of Engineering